Jure Detela (12 February 1951 – 17 January 1992) was a Slovene poet, writer, and essayist.

Detela was born in Ljubljana and studied art history at the University of Ljubljana. In his college years he collaborated with the poet Iztok Osojnik and sociologist Iztok Saksida in publishing their Podrealistični manifest (The Sub-Realist Manifesto) in 1979, and he later participated in the avantgarde group Pisarna Aleph (Aleph Office). Apart from poetry, he also published the autobiographical novel Pod strašnimi očmi pontonskih mostov (Under the Scary Eyes of Pontoon Bridges) in 1988. 
He died in Ljubljana in 1992.

Honors
In 1992 Detela was posthumously awarded the Jenko Award in 1995 for poetry. The 32nd Biennial of Graphic Arts (2017) in Ljubljana takes its title Birth as Criterion from one of Detela's poems as translated by Raymond Miller.

Poetry collections

 Zemljevidi (Maps), 1978
 Mah in srebro (Moss and Silver), 1983
 Pesmi (Poems), 1992
 Haiku = Haiku, with Iztok Osojnik, 2004

Prose

 Pod strašnimi očmi pontonskih mostov, (Under the Scary Eyes of Pontoon Bridges), novel, 1988
 Zapisi o umetnosti (Notes on Art), collection of essays, 2005

References

Slovenian poets
Slovenian male poets
1951 births
1992 deaths
University of Ljubljana alumni
Writers from Ljubljana
20th-century poets